The Henry Darling House is an historic house located at 786 Harris Avenue in Woonsocket, Rhode Island.  The two-story wood-frame house was constructed in 1865 by Henry Darling, a farmer, and was at that time on the rural outskirts of Woonsocket.

The house was listed on the National Register of Historic Places on November 26, 1982.

See also
National Register of Historic Places listings in Providence County, Rhode Island

References

Houses completed in 1865
Houses on the National Register of Historic Places in Rhode Island
Houses in Woonsocket, Rhode Island
National Register of Historic Places in Providence County, Rhode Island